Harrison Point Lighthouse is a lighthouse located in the northern Parish of Saint Lucy, Barbados.

History
The lighthouse has a cylindrical shape and it was the latest, of four lighthouses, to be built on the island, in 1925. The tower is white painted and the lantern is red; its characteristic, before the temporary deactivation. was two white flashes every 15 seconds. The lighthouse was deactivated probably in 2007, as reported by Admiralty, because it was on the ground  of a prison; the tower was abandoned and the keeper's house ruined. In 2011 the Admiralty confirmed the activity of the lighthouse with a continuous red light.

See also
 List of lighthouses in Barbados
 United States Naval Facility, Barbados

References

Lighthouses completed in 1925
Lighthouses in Barbados
Saint Lucy, Barbados